Streptomyces ruber is a bacterium species from the genus of Streptomyces which has been isolated from soil from the Baikal-region in Russia. Streptomyces ruber produces mycoticins. The strain EKH2 from Streptomyces ruber has activity against virulent fish pathogens.

Further reading

See also 
 List of Streptomyces species

References

External links
Type strain of Streptomyces ruber at BacDive -  the Bacterial Diversity Metadatabase

ruber
Bacteria described in 1986